This is the order of battle for the January 28 incident, also known as the first Shanghai incident, in 1932. This was a brief war between the armies of the Republic of China and the Empire of Japan that occurred prior to the Second Sino-Japanese War.

Because the Japanese assumed the tactical initiative, their forces are listed first.

Japan 

Shanghai Expeditionary Army
General Yoshinori Shirakawa 
 Chief of Staff: Lieutenant General Kanichiro Tashiro
 Army troops 
 Mixed Regiment Medium Artillery
 3 batteries (150mm howitzers, 12 guns, horse drawn)
 2 batteries (100mm guns, 8 guns, horse drawn)
 24th Mixed Brigade
 Major General Kumaya Shimomoto
 2nd Battalion / 14th Infantry Regiment 
 1st Battalion / 24th Infantry Regiment 
 1st Battalion / 46th Infantry Regiment 
 1st Battalion / 48th Infantry Regiment 
 2nd Battalion / 3rd Independent Mountain Gun Regiment 
 2nd Company / 18th Engineer Battalion
 9th Division
 Lieutenant General Kenkichi Ueda
 6th Infantry Brigade	 			
 7th Infantry Regiment		 		
 35th Infantry Regiment				
 18th Infantry Brigade				
 19th Infantry Regiment				
 36th Infantry Regiment				
 9th Mountain Artillery Regiment
 9th Cavalry Regiment	
 2nd Independent Tank Company
 Captain Shigemi
 5 Type 89 Medium Tanks
 10 Renault NC27 Tanks
 Cavalry Detachment
 Artillery Battalion (150mm howitzers)
 Heavy Siege Gun Unit (150mm mortars, 6 guns) 			
 11th Division
 Lieutenant General Tokutarou Koutou
 10th Infantry Brigade
 12th Infantry Regiment
 22nd Infantry Regiment
 22nd Infantry Brigade
 43rd Infantry Regiment
 44th Infantry Regiment
 11th Mountain Artillery Regiment
 11th Cavalry Regiment
 11th Engineer Regiment
 11th Army Service Detachment
 14th Division
 Lieutenant General Naosuke Matsuki
 27th Infantry Brigade 
 2nd Infantry Regiment
 59th Infantry Regiment
 28th Infantry Brigade
 15th Infantry Regiment
 50th Infantry Regiment
 20th Field Artillery Regiment
 18th Cavalry Regiment
 14th Engineer Regiment
 14th Battalion of Army Service Corps
 Army Air Service 
 3 bomber squadrons
 1 pursuit squadron (Nieuports)
 1 reconnaissance squadron

Third Fleet
Vice Admiral Kichisaburo Nomura
 1st Carrier Division (Koku-sentai)
 Fleet carrier Kaga (加賀) (flagship)
 Nakajima A1N fighters
 Mitsubishi B1M bombers
 Light carrier Hōshō (鳳翔)
 9 Nakajima A1N2 fighters
 3 Mitsubishi B2M bombers
 3 Mitsubishi C1M Type 10 reconnaissance aircraft
 32 other warships including
 1 Kongō-class battlecruiser: Kirishima (霧島)
 1 Nagara-class cruiser: Yura (由良)
 1 Tenryū-class cruiser: Tenryū (天龍)
 1 Mutsuki-class destroyer: Mutsuki (睦月)
 Shanghai SNLF 
 Captain Samejima (2,000 men)
 1st Battalion (Including Sasebo 1st SNLF) 
 2nd Battalion (Former Kure 1st SNLF) 
 3rd Battalion (Former Sasebo 2nd SNLF) 
 4th Battalion (Former Sasebo 3rd SNLF) 
 5th Battalion (Former Yokosuka 1st SNLF) 
 7th Battalion (Former Yokosuka 2nd SNLF) 
 Armed reservists (est. 2,800-2,900 men) and Ronin (est. 100-200 men)
 Total Naval forces in Shanghai as of Feb 1932: approx. 5,000 men

China 
Shanghai Front
General Cai Tingkai

 19th Route Army
 Lieutenant General Jiang Guangnai
 60th Division
 Major General Sheng Guanghan
 119th Brigade
 120th Brigade
 61st Division
 Lieutenant General Mao Weishou
 121st Brigade
 122nd Brigade
 78th Division
 Lieutenant General Shu Zu-nien
 155th Brigade
 156th Brigade
 3 Chinese armored trains (500 men)
 Woosung Forts Garrison (2,000 men)

 5th Army
 General Zhang Zhizhong
 87th Division
 Lieutenant General Lau Ching-yueh
 174th Brigade
 175th Brigade
 88th Division
 Lieutenant General Yu Jishi
 176th Brigade
 177th Brigade 
 Independent Brigade
 Major General Wang Ken

Notes

Sources

Print

Web 
 
 
 

January 28
January 28